James Aaron Bell (born June 4, 1948) is a retired American executive of The Boeing Company.

Bell is a retired president, executive vice president and chief financial officer of The Boeing Company. He served as interim president and chief executive officer of the Boeing Company on March, 2005, following the resignation of Harry Stonecipher.  He returned to his singular role as Boeing's CFO on June 30, 2005, following the appointment of Jim McNerney as the new president, chairman, and chief executive officer of the Boeing Company. He was appointed corporate president in June 2008.

Early life
On June 4, 1948, Bell was born in Los Angeles, California. Bell was the youngest of four children. Bell's mother Mamie was a former Los Angeles County government clerk. His father died in 2003.

Education
In 1971, Bell earned his bachelor's degree in accounting from California State University, Los Angeles.
A partial scholarship helped pay for his first year of college, but he had to earn enough to pay his way through the remainder of school.

Career
In 1972 he joined the Rockwell company as an accountant. At that company he followed a path into management, from corporate senior internal auditor to  accounting manager and finally as manager of general and cost accounting. He joined Boeing in 1996 when Rockwell's aerospace and defense units were acquired.

Within Boeing, he has held positions as vice president of contracts and pricing for the company's Space and Communications Division. He later became senior vice president of finance and corporate controller. In November 2004 he became the company's chief financial officer, following the firing of Michael M. Sears due to a government contract scandal. He is a member of the board of directors of J. P. Morgan Chase, Dow Chemical Company, the Chicago Urban League, World Business Chicago, the Chicago Economic Club, New Leaders for New Schools and Apple Inc.

Bell retired from the Boeing Company effective April 1, 2012. On February 1, 2012, Greg Smith succeeded Bell as executive vice president and chief financial officer of Boeing Company.

Career path

Awards
In 2004, at the 32nd Alumni Awards Gala, Bell was the recipient of California State University, Los Angeles's Distinguished Alumnus or Alumna of the College of Business and Economics.

Personal
Bell is married to Mary. Bell has two children, Champagne and Sean.  His campaign contributions were to Democratic party politicians.

References

External links
James A. Bell executive biography

  

American chief executives of manufacturing companies
American chief financial officers
Boeing people
Businesspeople from Illinois
California State University, Los Angeles alumni
Directors of Dow Inc.
Directors of Apple Inc.
1948 births
Living people